Soulie or Soulié is a surname. Notable people with the surname include:

Francois Soulie (born 1978), Andorran cross country skier
Gilbert Soulié (1800–1863), French Catholic missionary
Frédéric Soulié (1800–47), French novelist and playwright
George Soulié de Morant (1878–1955), French scholar and diplomat
Jacques Soulie, Sri Lankan psychiatrist

See also
13226 Soulié, a main-belt asteroid
Le Soulié, a French commune